Chensagi may refer to:

Toponyms

Canada
Chensagi River, a tributary of Maicasagi Lake, in Quebec
Chensagi River East, a tributary of Chensagi River
Chensagi River West, a tributary of Chensagi River
Chensagi Lake, a lake crossed by Chensagi River